Yakup Yıldız (born 4 October 2002) is a Turkish male compound archer and part of the national team.

Sport career
Yıldız won the gold medal together with his teammates in the second leg of the 2021 Archery World Cup in Lausanne, Switzerland. Hetook two gold medals, in the individual and the team event, at the 2021 European Archery Championships held in Antalya, Turkey.

In 2022, Yakup Yıldız won the bronze medal in the men's U-21 team compound event at the Laško, Slovenia event in the 2022 European Indoor Archery Championships. He won the gold medal in the men's team compound event at the European Archery Championships held in Munich, Germany. He also won the silver medal in the men's individual compound event.

References

2002 births
Living people
Turkish male archers
21st-century Turkish people